Sauris lineosa is a moth of the family Geometridae first described by Frederic Moore in 1888. It is found in India and Sri Lanka.

References

Moths of Asia
Moths described in 1888